Chuck Martini (born Choukri Moussaddik; 23 February 1970) is a Moroccan former footballer who played as a goalkeeper.

Club career
Born in Meknes, Morocco, Martini moved to England at the age of three. He started his career with the Tottenham Hotspur academy, before spending two years with Wimbledon. He also played for Leicester City at academy level. In 1990, he signed for Wycombe Wanderers, but would only go on to make two appearances in all competitions for the Chairboys. While at Wycombe Wanderers, he also represented them in five-a-side football. He had two short spells with Slough Town in 1992 and 1996, before leaving permanently for Barnet in 1996.

After a few months at Barnet, and failing to make an appearance, he moved to the United States, where he played for the Dallas Sidekicks, Indiana Twisters, Columbus Invaders and Connecticut Wolves.

On his return to England, Martini signed for King's Lynn Town in late 1998. In his two years with the club, he set a new clean sheet record. He also spent time with Farnborough in 2001, as well as playing for Sutton United, Folkestone Invicta and Dartford. He joined Maidstone United in March 2002, signing a three-match deal with the Stones. Later in the same year, he moved to Bromley, before his release in July 2003.

He had a short stint with Kingstonian in 2005, spent time with Worthing and Dulwich Hamlet, and then was at Molesey in 2007, where he told the club he would leave if he was not installed as manager, following the departure of Steve Beeks.

International career
There are numerous mentions of Martini as a "Moroccan international", with Martini himself saying he felt "blessed" to represent Morocco at international level on four occasions. According to one source, he played 17 games for the Morocco under-21 team and four times for the full national team; however, one of these games was apparently a 1–0 friendly loss to Brazil in 1998, with Ronaldo scoring the only goal - a game which in reality never took place.

Managerial career
Martini served as manager of Godalming Town between 2007 and 2010, when he switched to Walton & Hersham, spending two years with the Swans.

He has also served as head coach of the Muscat Football Academy in Oman.

References

External links
 Dallas Sidekicks profile

1970 births
Living people
People from Meknes
Moroccan footballers
English footballers
Association football goalkeepers
Isthmian League players
Continental Indoor Soccer League players
National Premier Soccer League players
A-League (1995–2004) players
Tottenham Hotspur F.C. players
Wimbledon F.C. players
Leicester City F.C. players
Wycombe Wanderers F.C. players
Slough Town F.C. players
Barnet F.C. players
Dallas Sidekicks (1984–2004) players
Indiana Twisters players
Canton Invaders players
Connecticut Wolves players
King's Lynn Town F.C. players
Farnborough F.C. players
Sutton United F.C. players
Maidstone United F.C. players
Dartford F.C. players
Bromley F.C. players
Folkestone Invicta F.C. players
Windsor & Eton F.C. players
Kingstonian F.C. players
Worthing F.C. players
Dulwich Hamlet F.C. players
Molesey F.C. players
Moroccan expatriate footballers
English expatriate footballers
Moroccan expatriate sportspeople in the United States
English expatriate sportspeople in the United States
Expatriate soccer players in the United States
Moroccan expatriate sportspeople in Oman
English expatriate sportspeople in Oman